Peter Mygind (born 28 August 1963) is a Danish actor and television personality. He has had roles in films including the World War II drama Flame & Citron as well as several TV series such as Borgen, Unit One, Lars Von Trier's The Kingdom, Sommerdahl (aka: The Sommerdahl Murders) and the police drama series Anna Pihl, as the roommate of the title character. Mygind hosted the Dansk Melodi Grand Prix (2011) and the quiz show Boom Boom. In 2005, he participated in Vild Med Dans, the Danish production of Dancing with the Stars.

Filmography

Personal life
Mygind was born in Frederiksberg, the son of actress and theater director Jytte Abildstrøm and her husband, Søren Mygind. His brother is Lars Mygind. On 10 August 1996 he married television journalist Lise Mühlhausen.

References

Further reading

Public Speaks

External links

1963 births
Danish male television actors
Danish male film actors
Living people
People from Frederiksberg